The 2016 WHB Hungarian Open was a professional tennis tournament played on indoor hardcourt. It was the inaugural edition of the tournament and was part of the 2016 ATP Challenger Tour. It took place in Budapest, Hungary between 24 and 30 October 2016.

Singles main draw entrants

Seeds

 1 Rankings are as of October 17, 2016.

Other entrants
The following players received wildcards into the singles main draw:
  Cem İlkel
  Daniil Medvedev
  Péter Nagy
  Tommy Robredo

The following player received entry into the singles main draw using a protected ranking:
  Cedrik-Marcel Stebe

The following player received entry into the singles main draw through special exempt:
  Norbert Gombos

The following player entered as an alternate:
  Federico Gaio

The following players received entry from the qualifying draw:
  Marsel İlhan
  Tristan Lamasine
  Ante Pavić
  Michał Przysiężny

Champions

Singles

  Marius Copil def.  Steve Darcis, 6–4, 6–2.

Doubles

  Aliaksandr Bury /  Andreas Siljeström def.  James Cerretani /  Philipp Oswald, 6–4, 7–6(7–4).

WHB Hungarian Open
2016 in Hungarian tennis